Yada Sengyong  (born 10 September 1993) is a Thai footballer who plays as a goalkeeper for the Thailand women's national football team. She was part of the team at the 2015 FIFA Women's World Cup. On club level she plays for North Bangkok College in Thailand.

References

1993 births
Living people
Yada Sengyong
Yada Sengyong
2015 FIFA Women's World Cup players
Yada Sengyong
Women's association football goalkeepers
Yada Sengyong
Southeast Asian Games medalists in football
Competitors at the 2017 Southeast Asian Games
Competitors at the 2019 Southeast Asian Games
Footballers at the 2014 Asian Games
Yada Sengyong